William Kane may refer to:

William Francis de Vismes Kane (1840–1918), Irish entomologist
Will Kane, a fictional character
Billy Kane, a video game character

See also
William Cain (disambiguation)
William Caine (disambiguation)
Kane (surname)
Kane Williamson